is a 1968 Japanese yakuza film directed by Kōsaku Yamashita. It stars Junko Fuji. She landed the lead role for the first time in the film and The Valiant Red Peony was a big hit. The Valiant Red Peony is the first episode in the Valiant Red Peony aka Hibotan Bakuto film series.

Oryū's father is a head of the Yano clan (yakuza boss), but is assassinated by someone. Oryū dissolves the Yano clan and she goes on a journey to find the person who killed her father.

Cast
 Junko Fuji as Oryū
 Tomisaburo Wakayama as Torasaka Kumakichi
 Kyosuke Machida as Fujimi no Fujimatsu
 Rinichi Yamamoto as Fugushin
 Nijiko Kiyokawa as Otaka
 Isamu Dobashi as Minagawa
 Yuriko Mishima as Kimika
 Masaru Shiga as Kame
 Kōjirō Kawanami as Tajima
 Masako Araki as Otatsu
 Kunio Hikita as Takizawa
 Yaeko Wakamizu as Kumasaka
 Kyōnosuke Murai as Senzō Yano
 Minoru Ōki as Gōzō Kakui
 Shingo Yamashiro as Kichitarō
 Nobuo Kaneko as Genzō Iwatsu
 Ken Takakura as Katagiri Naoji

Film series
 The Valiant Red Peony Pt.2 directed by Norifumi Suzuki (1968)
 The Valiant Red Peony Flower Cards Match directed by Tai Kato (1969)
 The Valiant Red Peony Pt.4 directed by Shigehiro Ozawa (1969)
 The Valiant Red Peony Pt.5 directed by Kōsaku Yamashita (1969)
 The Valiant Red Peony Gambles Her Life or The Valiant Red Peony Gamble Oryu’s Return directed by Tai Kato (1970)
 The Valiant Red Peony: You are Dead  directed by Tai Kato (1971)
 The Valiant Red Peony Pt.8  directed by Buichi Saitō (1972)

References

External links
The Valiant Red Peony at Toei

1968 films
1960s Japanese-language films
1960s Japanese films
Toei Company films
Films about hanafuda
Films set in the 19th century
Yakuza films